Denmark competed at the 2012 European Athletics Championships held in Helsinki, Finland, between 27 June to 1 July 2012.

Medals

Results

Men
Track events

Field events

Women
Track events

Field events

References
 

2012
Nations at the 2012 European Athletics Championships